Itatiaia National Park, established in 1937, is the oldest national park in Brazil. 
It is located on the border between the states of Rio de Janeiro and Minas Gerais.

Location

The Itatiaia National Park is the oldest national park of Brazil, created on 14 June 1937 by President Getúlio Vargas.
The park is in the Mantiqueira Mountains.
It covers parts of the municipalities of Itatiaia and Resende in Rio de Janeiro state, and Bocaina de Minas and Itamonte in Minas Gerais state. 
The highest point is the Black Needles peak (Pico das Agulhas Negras).

The higher part of the park contains the origins of 12 river basins that supply the Rio Grande (Grand River), a tributary of the Paraná River, and the Paraíba do Sul, the most important river in Rio de Janeiro state.
The lower part of the park has lush Atlantic Forest vegetation and wide rivers with natural pools and waterfalls.

The park attracts bird watchers from all over the world with its 350 species of birds. Other attractions include hiking and rock climbing.
The park is surrounded by the Serra da Mantiqueira Environmental Protection Area which provides an ecological buffer zone for the park.

The high area of the park is accessible through an entrance about 35 km from the main entrance and gives access to the Pico das Agulhas Negras and Prateleiras complex. 
The low area of the park is much closer to the city of Itatiaia and has many waterfalls, such as Véu da Noiva with 45 meters. The low area has also a Natural History museum.
Itatiaia means "many-pointed rock" in the Tupi language.

Gallery

Notes

Sources

Further reading
 Jorge Pádua, Maria Tereza e Coimbra Filho, Adelmar F. Os Parques Nacionais do Brasil. Instituto de Cooperação Iberoamericana. Madrid. José Olympio Editora, 1989. , pág. 122 a 129
 Corrêa, Marcos Sá "Itatiaia - O Caminho das Pedras" São Paulo. Metalivros, 2003. , 240 pág.
 Leite, Helton Perillo Ferreira - "Planalto do Itatiaia - Região das Agulhas Negras", Rio de Janeiro. Montanhar / Publit, 2007. Edição parcialmente trilíngue. , 232 páginas.

National parks of Brazil
Protected areas established in 1937
Itatiaia
Protected areas of Minas Gerais
Protected areas of Rio de Janeiro (state)
1917 establishments in Brazil
Protected areas of the Atlantic Forest